The Galleria at Crystal Run is a shopping center located in the Town of Wallkill, New York. It is the second-largest mall in New York's Hudson Valley region.

History 

The galleria, which opened in 1992, has an area of 1,100,000 square feet (99,000 m²) on two floors. It has 120 shops and restaurants, as well as a 16-screen AMC Theatres. 

The Galleria is owned and managed by The Pyramid Companies, a group that also owns and manages regional sisters Poughkeepsie Galleria in Poughkeepsie (the model for Crystal Run), and Palisades Center in West Nyack.

2017 gun discharge incident
On November 26, 2017, an unknown man discharged a handgun inside the mall into the floor, causing a lockdown and response from local police forces, New York State Police, and the FBI. A 49-year-old woman and her 12-year-old son suffered minor injuries.

On November 28, 2017, a suspect from Forest City, Pennsylvania turned himself into police and was charged with first-degree reckless endangerment and two counts of third-degree assault.

Current anchors
Macy's
JCPenney
Dick's Sporting Goods 
Target

Former anchors
Filene's 
G. Fox 
Sears 
Steinbach

References

External links 
Pyramid profile of Galleria at Crystal Run

Buildings and structures in Orange County, New York
Shopping malls in New York (state)
The Pyramid Companies
Tourist attractions in Orange County, New York
Middletown, Orange County, New York
Shopping malls established in 1992
Shopping malls in the New York metropolitan area
1992 establishments in New York (state)